Guanshan railway station is a railway station located in Guanshan Township, Taitung County, Taiwan. It is located on the Taitung line and is operated by Taiwan Railways.

Around the station
 Guanshan Waterfront Park

References

1922 establishments in Taiwan
Railway stations opened in 1922
Railway stations in Taitung County
Railway stations served by Taiwan Railways Administration